Elia Interguglielmi (1746 – 16 May 1835) was an Italian painter of the Neoclassical style, active in Naples and Palermo.

He was born in Naples and died in Palermo. He initially worked under Gaspare Fumagalli in Palermo, but in 1762 was working in Naples as an assistant to Giuseppe Bonito and Antonio Dominici. He returned to Palermo where he worked in the fresco decoration of palaces and churches.

One of his descendants, likely grandson, is Eugenio Interguglielmi (19th century), who was a prominent photographer in Palermo. His family. In 1863, he opened a studio on largo Santa Sofia and corso Vittorio Emanuele. Eugenio the younger (1876-1948) was also a photographer, with a studio on via Cavour n. 84, facing piazzetta Valenti. Eugenio the younger's sister, Celestina (1880 - 1957) married the photographer Benedetto Bronzetti (1870 - 1944). There son Eugenio Bronzetti was also a prominent photographer. Roberto Interguglielmi (1912 - 1999) was also a photographer. Finally, the granddaughter of Roberto since 1999 has worked at photography.

References

Derived from Italian Wikipedia entry

1746 births
1835 deaths
18th-century Italian painters
19th-century Italian painters
Italian male painters
Painters from Naples
Rococo painters
19th-century Italian male artists
18th-century Italian male artists